Mansur Beg was a Safavid official, who served as the first Safavid governor (hakem) of Derbent (Darband), in 1509, during the reign of king Ismail I (r. 1501-1524). Following his brief tenure, he was succeeded by members of the Shirvanshah family who governed the city under Safavid suzerainty, usually through castellans, until 1538. After that, directly appointed Safavid officials came to govern it again.

References

Sources
 
  

Safavid governors of Derbent
16th-century deaths
16th-century people of Safavid Iran